Competitiveness Index may refer to:

Global Competitiveness Report based on the Global Competitiveness Index, published by the World Economic Forum
World Competitiveness Yearbook published by the Swiss International Institute for Management Development
Space Competitiveness Index, published annually since 2008 by Futron Corporation
Travel and Tourism Competitiveness Report (Vietnam)
India City Competitiveness Index
IT industry competitiveness index

See also
Competition (disambiguation)